Mary of Jesus may refer to:
 Mary (mother of Jesus), Mary of Nazareth, the mother of Jesus
 Saint Marie-Eugénie de Jésus (1817–1898), founder of the congregation of the Religious of the Assumption
 Venerable Mary of Jesus of Ágreda (1602 –1665), Franciscan abbess and spiritual writer
 Blessed María López de Rivas Martínez (1560 – 1640), known as Mary of Jesus, Carmelite nun
 Blessed Émilie d'Oultremont (1818–1878), known as Mother Mary of Jesus, Belgian nun who founded the Sisters of Mary Reparatrix
 Saint Mariam Baouardy (1846 –1878), known as Mary of Jesus Crucified, Carmelite nun and mystic
 Mary of Jesus de León y Delgado (1643 –1741), Spanish Dominican lay sister
 Antoinette Fage (1824–1883), known as Marie of Jesus, co-founder of the Little Sisters of the Assumption
 Blessed Bernard Mary of Jesus (1831–1911),  Italian priest
 Blessed Franciszka Siedliska (1842 –1902), known as Mother Mary of Jesus the Good Shepherd, founder of the Sisters of the Holy Family of Nazareth